The Water Resources Act 1991 (WRA) is an Act of the Parliament of the United Kingdom that regulates water resources, water quality and pollution, and flood defence. Part II of the Act provides the general structure for the management of water resources. Part III explains the standards expected for controlled waters; and what is considered to be water pollution. Part IV provides information on mitigation through flood defence.

Background
The Water Resources Act was introduced in December 1991 along with four other pieces of legislation (Water Industry Act 1991, Land Drainage Act 1991, Statutory Water Act 1991 and the Water (Consequential Provisions) Act 1991) whose combined purpose was to consolidate existing water legislation, which was previously spread out over 20 separate pieces of legislation. The Act governs the quality and quantity of water by outlining the functions of the Environment Agency (previously the National Rivers Authority). The WRA sets out offences relating to water, discharge consents, and possible defences to the offences. The Environment Agency has the power to bring criminal charges against people or companies responsible for crimes concerning water.

Part II – resource management
The WRA explains that the duty of the Agency is to “so far as is reasonably practicable” maintain, with water undertakers, secure and proper management of any reservoirs, apparatus or other works which belong to and are operated and controlled by them. The Agency will alert water undertakers as to any arrangements made by the Secretary of State or the Director General of Water Services, and any such arrangements made by them will be enforceable under section 18 of the Act

Part III –  Quality objectives 
The legal framework for meeting quality standards for the environment is found within s82 to s84. The duty of the Secretary of State (currently the Secretary of State for Environment, Food and Rural Affairs) is to ‘prescribe a system of classifying the quality of those waters’. Under s.82, classification regulations provide the standards that must be met for controlled waters to be under a specific classification. In relation to this, the Act provides reference to the purposes of the water, substances within the water or absent from it and requirements as to other characteristics. Under s83, water quality objectives for controlled waters are created by the Secretary of State. Water quality standards provide goals for the Environment Agency to exercise its functions under s84 and to further maintain the quality objectives for controlled waters.

Practical evaluation systems known as General Quality Assessments (GQAs) were established by the Environment Agency in attempts to monitor inland waters by testing both biological and chemical substances which could affect the overall health of the surrounding ecosystems. In addition, nutrient sampling is undertaken in the assessments by the Environment Agency to establish whether natural biological waste from runoff in nearby areas is causing a significant change in the water quality. It has been argued that, although the monitoring system can be viewed as an improvement in water regulation, no enforcement techniques are in place to punish those with low-quality GQA results.

s.85 The main water pollution offence
Basic outline - Discharge consents are required by the Environment Agency from companies who, ‘discharge sewage or trade effluent directly into surface water, such as rivers, streams, canals, groundwater or the sea,’. Consents are set and enforced on an individual basis with regard to quality of the water source and the surrounding catchment. Other factors taken into account include the location and abstraction points used for public water supplies. Water companies are now bound by statutory enforcement to produce 25 year water resource management plans.

Section 85 of the WRA is concerned with the offence of polluting controlled water. The purpose of the section is to impose criminal liability on those who pollute natural water resources. The main offence states that it is an offence to cause or knowingly permit poisonous, noxious, or polluting matter or any solid waste to enter any controlled waters. Further offences, for example, a breach of conditions in a discharge consent, are also introduced by s.85.

This is a strict liability offence; intention or negligence by the defendant is not required for the offence to be committed, as illustrated by the word ‘cause’. The second component of the offence, ‘knowingly permit’ is used less frequently in prosecutions, as it requires proof of intention in order for the defendant to be liable. The Environment Agency or a private individual or association may bring prosecutions under Section 85. Section 85 does not define the words poisonous, noxious, or polluting; therefore leaving the words open to flexible definition by the courts. Controlled waters are defined in section 104 of the Act and include territorial, coastal, inland and ground waters. (ref Water Resources Act 1991 s.104). The penalties for contravention of s. 85, range from a term of imprisonment not exceeding 3 months or a fine not exceeding £20,000 or both. Infringements that are more serious can carry penalties of imprisonment not exceeding two years, an unlimited fine, or both.

Cases In Alphacell v Woodward [1972] 2 All ER 475, it was found that the prosecution only have to show there was some underlying operation to cause pollution. There is no need for the prosecution to show the defendant was negligent or at fault. A number cases followed that introduced requirements for some positive act on the part of the defendant (e.g. Wychavon District Council v National Rivers Authority [1993] Env LR 230, and found that the act of a third party, for example a vandal breaking a tap on a fuel tank, could break the chain of causation (Impress (Worcestor) Ltd v Rees [1971] 2 All ER 357) However, in the case of Empress Car Company (Abertillery) v National Rivers Authority [1998] Env LR 396, it was held that the law had taken a wrong turn and had to go back to the Alphacell v Woodward approach. The idea of a positive act was unnecessary and the underlying operation is that the defendant must do something. The test for whether the actions of third parties could break the chain of causation was whether the intervening event was a normal and familiar fact of life or an abnormal and extraordinary event.

De-criminalisation/reform - Commentators have highlighted a number of rationales for the imposition of strict liability; to act as a deterrent, to promote the public interest goal in preventing environmental harm and to promote the polluter pays principle. Nonetheless, as strict liability offences require no mental responsibility or fault, art of an offence, this can lead to criminalising innocent or accidental actions.

Due to a growing dissatisfaction with existing criminal sanctions, alternative sanctions have been considered such as naming and shaming polluters, fixed monetary penalties, discretionary requirements, and enforcement undertakings.

Preventive powers
S.92 – Requirements to take precautions against pollution; The Secretary of State has the power to take precautions to make regulations concerning precautionary measures in relation to any poisonous, noxious or polluting matter to prevent it from entering controlled waters. As a result of these powers the Silage, Slurry, Agricultural and Fuel Oil Regulations 1991 were enacted to aid the control and prevention of pollution e.g. through new storage systems for slurry.

S.93 – Water Protection Zones; The Secretary of State may designate water protection zones, where appropriate for prohibiting or carrying on in that area of activities which the Secretary of State considers likely to result in water pollution. This enables the Environment Agency to exercise control over pesticides and other potential pollutants within the zones.

S.94 – 95 – Nitrate Sensitive Areas and Agreements in Nitrate Sensitive Areas Provides control over agricultural activity with the aim of reducing the amount of nitrate from agricultural land in to groundwater sources – targeting areas where nitrate levels breach or are likely to breach the 50 mg per litre set by the EC Drinking Water Directive (80/778/EEC.) Nitrate vulnerable zones from 01/01/09 have risen from 55% and now cover 68% of total U.K land

S.97 – Codes of Good Agricultural Practice Encourages and promotes good framing practices via practical guidance, whilst maintain control and reducing pollution.

Part IV – flood defence
The Environment Agency exercises a general supervision over all matters relating to flood defence. Under s.105 this includes conducting environmental surveys from time to time. Section 106 covers the obligation to carry out flood defence functions through committees. Within each region each committee is empowered to maintain, improve or construct drainage works for the purpose of defence against sea water or tidal water anywhere in their area. They must also provide flood warning systems. Section 107 covers the main river functions under the Land Drainage Act 1991 and this is the power for securing the maintenance of flow of watercourses.

Parts I and V-IX Most other Parts of the Act, (including Part I on the role of the National Rivers Authority and Parts VI and VIII on the Authority's finances and informational duties) were repealed by the introduction of the Environment Agency.

References

External links

Environment Agency website
 http://www.environment-agency.gov.uk/

DEFRA water policy
 http://www.defra.gov.uk/environment/quality/water/index.htm

UK Legislation 

United Kingdom Acts of Parliament 1991
Water supply and sanitation in the United Kingdom